Monster Beverage Corporation is an American beverage company that manufactures energy drinks including Monster Energy, Relentless and Burn. The company was originally founded as Hansen's in 1935 in Southern California, originally selling juice products. The company renamed itself as Monster Beverage in 2012, and then sold their Hansen's juices and sodas and their other non-energy drink brands to The Coca-Cola Company in 2015.

As of 2020, Monster held nearly 39% of the $5.7 billion US energy drink market, the second highest share after Red Bull.

History
Hansen's was founded in 1935. In the 1930s, Hubert Hansen and his three sons began selling juice to film studios and retailers in Southern California under the Hansen's name. In the 1970s, Tim Hansen (the grandson of Hubert) developed and marketed a variety of sodas and juices, also under the Hansen's label.

The company became Hansen's Juices, and later The Fresh Juice Company of California. The plant that was opened in Los Angeles in 1946 was used until operations were moved to a new plant in Azusa, California in 1993. The company filed for bankruptcy in 1988, and was acquired by the California CoPackers Corporation and renamed Hansen Natural Company. In 1998, the company moved from Anaheim, California to Corona, California. On January 5, 2012, after energy drinks had grown to the largest source of revenue, shareholders agreed to change the name of the company from Hansen's Natural to Monster Beverage Corporation, under the new ticker MNST. Shareholders also approved an increase in the number of authorized shares of common stock to 240,000,000 shares from 120,000,000 shares.

In April 2008, the U.S. Food and Drug Administration ruled products containing high-fructose corn syrup could not be labeled "natural". Shortly after, Hansen's Natural Corporation announced they had begun using cane sugar instead.

In September 2009, Hansen brand Monster Energy sent a cease and desist letter to Rock Art Brewery, demanding the microbrewery stop selling its new Vermonster beer, drop its pursuit of a federal trademark for the name, and pay Hansen's lawyer fees. This resulted in a boycott of all Hansen products by a few Vermont retailers.

In June 2015, The Coca-Cola Company took ownership of Hansen's juice products and sodas, Hubert's Lemonade, Blue Sky sodas, Peace Tea and other non-energy drink brands, in exchange for their energy drink brands.

The Coca-Cola Company bought a 16.7% stake for $2.15 billion in Monster Beverage Corp in 2015. This stake has since grown to 19.3% due to share buybacks conducted by Monster Beverage Corp.

In 
February 2022, it was reported Monster and Constellation Brands were considering a merger which would have a combined market capitalization above $90 billion.

Sponsorship
NASCAR announced on December 1, 2016, a multi-year deal that will make Monster Energy only the third entitlement sponsor in its premier series history. However, this deal ended after the 2019 race season, and the series will be known as simply the "NASCAR Cup Series" from 2020 onward. The company is expected to continue sponsoring individual drivers, including Kurt Busch, Ty Gibbs, Hailie Deegan, and Riley Herbst into the future.  Monster remains a secondary sponsor.

Professional Bull Riders Unleash the Beast Series carries a Monster Energy sponsorship.

World of Outlaws features the NOS brand as its title sponsor.

AMA Supercross features Monster Energy as its title sponsor.

Finances 
For the fiscal year 2017, Monster Beverage reported earnings of US$821 million, with an annual revenue of US$3.369 billion, an increase of 10.5% over the previous fiscal cycle. Monster Beverage's shares traded at over $51 per share, and its market capitalization was valued at US$29.9 billion in November 2018.

Products

 Monster Energy
 Relentless
 Full Throttle
 NOS
 Mother
 Burn
 Predator
 Reign
 Live
 True North

Former products

Natural soda

Natural Soda comes in twelve flavors: Original Cola, Ginger Ale, Key Lime Twist, Cherry Vanilla Creme, Grapefruit, Kiwi Strawberry, Vanilla Cola, Mandarin Lime, Creamy Root Beer, Raspberry, Mango Orange, and Pomegranate. All Hansen's sodas are made with cane sugar.

Diet soda
Their Diet Soda is available in ten flavors: Cola, Black Cherry, Peach, Kiwi Strawberry, Vanilla Cherry Créme, Tangerine, Lime, Ginger Ale, Root Beer, Grapefruit, and Pomegranate. Hansen's diet soda is sweetened with acesulfame potassium and sucralose. All diet sodas are OU Kosher certified.

Drink mixers

Monster Beverage sells three flavors of soda mixer: Tonic, Ginger Ale, and Club Soda.

Fruit juices

The company sells thirteen fruit juices in 64-ounce PET bottles, several of which are available in smaller bottles for kids. These include Apple, Grape, White Grape, Pineapple, Apple Grape, Apple Strawberry, Orange, Cranberry Apple, Ruby Red Grapefruit, Pomegranate, Organic Apple White Grape, Organic Apple Wild Berry and Organic Apple. Hansen's Natural Organic Apple Juice is made solely from concentrates the company obtains from China. Hansen's uses concentrates from China in other varieties of its juices, despite the availability of such juice concentrates made from fruit grown and processed in the United States, which grows an abundance of apples, as well as many of the other fruits used in Hansen's juice products. These juices contain 120% of the United States Recommended Daily Allowances (USRDA) for Vitamin C (except Pomegranate, which contains 100%).

In 2009, Monster Beverage introduced Hansen's Natural Lo-Cal 64-ounce juice cocktails, in four flavors. They are sweetened with Truvia.

Hansen's fruit juice smoothies contain approximately 25% juice and provide 100% of the recommended daily adult intake of Vitamins A, C, and E. They are packaged in 11.5-ounce aluminum cans.

Juices for children
Hansen's Juice Blast line of children's juice drinks was launched in conjunction with Costco and sold in Costco stores. Hansen also has a Juice Slam line of children's juice drinks. Both lines are sold in 6.75-ounce boxes.

In May 2001, Hansen's acquired the Junior Juice beverage business. Hansen's Junior Juice is 100% juice, sold in 4.23-ounce cartons and targeted at toddlers and preschoolers. Certain flavors of Junior Juice have calcium added and all flavors contain 100% of the daily recommended allowance of Vitamin C. The brand was introduced in 1991 by McCain Foods, and sold to the Pasco Beverage Group in 2000 before being sold again, to Hansen's. Hansen's replaced the original four mascots, Uncle Froggy, Emily the Mouse, Ronald Rabbit, and Nick the Fox, with Clifford the Big Red Dog.

In July 2008, Hansen's introduced Hansen's Organic Junior Water, in 4.23-ounce packages aimed at children between two and six years old. The Hansen's Organic Junior Water line of flavored water contains 100% of the daily recommended allowance of Vitamin C and thirty calories per serving. Also in 2008, organic Junior Water was introduced. Hansen's later introduced Coconut Water Twist, containing coconut water, and Garden Twist, a combination of fruits and vegetables, which is the only Junior Juice variant to be sold in bottles.

Other beverages
Smoothies, Rumba Energy Juice, Energade, and Energy Formula, are minor products. Monster owns Blue Sky Beverage Company, which manufactures several soft drinks. Monster produces the Monster, Lost, and Rumba energy drinks, which were previously distributed in the United States by Anheuser Busch. On November 10, 2008, distribution of the Monster Energy and Monster Java products was turned over to Coca-Cola Enterprises.

In August 2009, Hansen's introduced the SELF Beauty Elixir line, a low-calorie beverage containing vitamins, minerals, natural fruit & botanical extracts, antioxidants and 30% fruit juice. The beverage contains 35 calories and a low amount of sodium per 8-ounce aluminum can.

Signature Soda

Hansen's Signature Soda line included Black Cherry, Vanilla Cream, Orange Cream, Ginger Beer, and Sarsaparilla flavors.

Natural and diet tea sodas

Hansen's Natural and Diet Soda flavors included: Black Cherry, Tangerine, Tropical, Orange Mango, Peach Mango, Peach, Cherry, Cranberry, Clear Root Beer, Vanilla Coffee, Low Cal Wildberry, Low Cal Cola, and Low Cal Creamy Cola.

In 2006, Hansen's introduced a line of iced teas in 16-ounce PET bottles. Some varieties were sweetened with cane sugar and some were unsweetened. Flavors included Lemon Mint, Pomegranate, Ginger, and Tangerine. There were also three flavors of diet green tea soda: Lemon Mint, Ginger and Tangerine. Each bottle of tea contained 75 mg of Epigallocatechin gallate. Hansen's also made tea bags.

Controversies 
In 2018, The Huffington Post brought out an article in which five women accused Monster Beverage of having an abusive and discriminatory culture. Brent Hamilton, then head of music marketing at Monster Energy, had been charged with assault for strangling and biting his girlfriend in 2016, but he wasn't let go until 2019, allegedly for sexual misconduct. Manager Phillip Deitrich regularly humiliated and boycotted a female subordinate in public, and denied her increases in compensation. VP John Kenneally was accused of retaliation, bullying, and sexual harassment. According to three women, he subverted their reputations and forced them to abandon the company. One woman had responded to his advances but suffered nothing but abuse as a consequence of his jealous personality. She was ultimately forced out of the company by Kenneally after objecting to him calling her a "whore". Kenneally was fired two weeks after the article was released. In March 2018, a sixth woman came forward, accusing retired manager Ted Cook of sexual harassment, and claimed being fired for mercurial reasons.

In 2022, attorneys representing for Monster Beverage went after a small, mom-and-pop shop called "Surf Monster", a small apparel company operated by Ben Wells of Black Stone Cherry. Thereby, they have been forced to rebrand.

References

External links

Food and drink companies established in 1935
1935 establishments in California
Companies based in Corona, California
Drink companies based in California
Companies that filed for Chapter 11 bankruptcy in 1988
1990 initial public offerings
Coca-Cola